Oarța de Jos is a commune in Maramureș County, Crișana, Romania. It is composed of three villages: Oarța de Jos, Oarța de Sus (Felsővárca), and Orțița (Középvárca).

The river Oarța flows through the commune's three villages.

References

Communes in Maramureș County
Localities in Crișana